Banówka may refer to:

 Banówka, Polish name for the Mamonovka River
 Banówka, Polish name for Baníkov, a mountain in the Western Tatras mountain range